Gustavo Ildefonso Mendívil Amparán (born 17 March 1960) is a Mexican politician from the Institutional Revolutionary Party. From 2006 to 2009 he served as Deputy of the LX Legislature of the Mexican Congress representing Sonora.

References

1960 births
Living people
Politicians from Sonora
Institutional Revolutionary Party politicians
21st-century Mexican politicians
Mexican people of Basque descent
Universidad de Sonora alumni
Deputies of the LX Legislature of Mexico
Members of the Chamber of Deputies (Mexico) for Sonora